Ranunculus californicus, commonly known as the California buttercup, is a flowering plant of the buttercup family Ranunculaceae. It is a native of California, where it is common in many habitats, including chaparral and woodlands.

Its distribution extends across many habitats of California, north into Oregon and south into Baja California. Its reported locations include the islands between British Columbia and Washington, the Channel Islands of California, and the Sierra Nevada.

Description
Each flower grows on a long, green, leafless stem.

Varieties
 Ranunculus californicus var. californicus 
 Ranunculus californicus var. cuneatus

Cultivation
Ranunculus californicus is cultivated as an ornamental plant, for use in native plant gardens.

See also
List of California native plants

References
Notes

Sources
Munz, Philip A. (2003). Introduction to Shore Wildflowers of California, Oregon, and Washington. Berkeley: University of California Press.

External links
CalFlora Database: Ranunculus californicus (Botta's clarkia,  punch bowl godetia)
Jepson Manual eFlora (TJM2) treatment of Ranunculus californicus
U.C. Photo gallery — Ranunculus californicus

californicus
Flora of California
Flora of Oregon
Flora of Baja California
Flora of the California desert regions
Flora of the Cascade Range
Flora of the Klamath Mountains
Flora of the Sierra Nevada (United States)
Natural history of the California chaparral and woodlands
Natural history of the California Coast Ranges
Natural history of the Central Valley (California)
Natural history of the Peninsular Ranges
Natural history of the Santa Monica Mountains
Natural history of the Transverse Ranges
Garden plants of North America
Flora without expected TNC conservation status